XHTO-FM (104.3 MHz "104.3 HITfm") is an English-language Top 40 (CHR) radio station.  The city of license is Ciudad Juárez, Chihuahua, and it serves Mexico-U.S. border communities, including the El Paso metropolitan area.

The station is owned by Grupo Radiorama and operated by Grupo Radio Centro (GRM Communications in USA).  While its transmitter is in Mexico, XHTO broadcasts in English and it maintains its studios and sales office in El Paso.

History
XHTO was originally owned by Joaquín Vargas Gómez, founder of MVS Radio.  In 1977, the station was transferred to Frecuencia Modulada de Ciudad Juárez, S.A., which was later sold to Grupo Radiorama. Sometime in the 2000s, Grupo Radio México took the control of XHTO-FM from Radiorama, which holds its concession. In 2015, the merger of Grupo Radio México into co-owned Grupo Radio Centro resulted in GRC taking control of XHTO.

XHTO, which originally was an English adult contemporary outlet as Stereorey under Joaquín Vargas Gómez, changed to a Spanish contemporary outlet under Radiorama, and then to an English-language top 40/contemporary hit radio (CHR) format under Grupo Radio México in 2001. By 2003, it shifted directions to rhythmic contemporary music to compete directly against KPRR. As of September 2013, the station returned to a mainstream CHR presentation, albeit still featuring a dance/rhythmic lean, and reports to Mediabase as a mainstream Top 40.

References

External links
 

Contemporary hit radio stations in Mexico
Radio stations in Chihuahua
Mass media in Ciudad Juárez
Mass media in El Paso, Texas
Grupo Radio Centro